Leys Institute Library Ponsonby is a branch of Auckland Libraries that serves the suburbs of Ponsonby, Saint Marys Bay, Herne Bay, and Freemans Bay. It is housed in The Leys Institute, a pair of historic buildings that incorporate a lecture hall, a meeting room and a gymnasium, as well as a public library.

History and function
The larger of the two buildings—which houses the library, lecture hall and meeting room—was opened on 29 March 1905 by the mayor of Auckland, the Hon. Edwin Mitchelson. The smaller building, containing the gymnasium, was opened on 4 July 1906 by Thomson Leys. The larger building "was the first major public building in the expanding suburb of Ponsonby", and the library it contained was "the first library in the Council area, following the establishment and construction of the central library in the city".

The institute was designed as a Mechanics' Institute, its purpose being to provide opportunities for "rational recreation" to the working class of the area. The original inspiration for the institute came from William Leys (see below), who, in correspondence to relatives in England, expressed his wish to do something in this direction for the youth of Ponsonby, who he frequently observed loitering around the Three Lamps area and tavern, later known as The Gluepot.

The official objectives of the institute, as stated in the visitors' guide of 1906 are: "To establish and maintain a Free Public Library and Reading Room, and also to promote literary culture and technical education, and to advance in other ways the intellectual development and social welfare of the community. Provision is made for rational recreation, and encouragement is offered for the formation of Classes, Clubs and Societies, associated with the Institute, under such regulations as may be framed from time to time, or approved by the Committee of Management."

Control of the Leys Institute passed to the Auckland City Council on 1 April 1964, after the death on 19 March of Fraser Thomson of Christchurch, the last trustee of William Leys.

Building

The library building, like its companion, is constructed of brick with a cement face. According to the plaque on the front of the building, the architectural style is Edwardian Baroque. Tours of the Leys Institute are conducted annually as part of the Auckland Heritage Festival in late September and early October.

The library is considered a nationally significant example of the Victorian ideals of education, self-improvement, and the philanthropic attitude of the middle class. It was registered as a Category I heritage structure on 26 November 1981 by the New Zealand Historic Places Trust.

Founders

William Leys was a small-businessman who lived in Auckland in the latter half of the nineteenth century. He emigrated from England with his family in 1868, being then 11, and settled in Ponsonby, attending Newton Central School. Leaving formal education behind at an early age, he became an apprentice bookbinder, eventually setting up his own business in the trade at the age of 20. He was a liberal and a community-minded man. He served on several committees, including the Ponsonby School Committee. It was here, presumably, that his passion for furthering the educational opportunities of Auckland youth was ignited, leading eventually to the development of what was to become his dream project: The Leys Institute. Unfortunately, he did not live to see this project realised. And because his own business never made much money, he was unable to leave much in the way of a legacy for its realisation, after having provided for his wife and daughter and a nephew. William Leys died of stomach cancer en route from England to New Zealand in 1899, and is buried in Colombo, Ceylon (now Sri Lanka).

Thomson Leys, younger brother of William, followed a different course in life, though he was a man no less public-spirited. Having been educated in Nottingham he served a three-year apprenticeship with the Southern Cross newspaper in Auckland. Rising through the ranks he eventually attained the position of editor of the Auckland Star in 1876, and as such became a person of considerable influence in the city. His connections with notable contemporaries, including politicians (Maui Pomere, Sir Āpirana Ngata) and influential social leaders (such as Truby King) meant that he was able, finally, to put his brother's vision for a Mechanics’ Institute on a sound footing, and The Leys Institute Trust was established. Originally it was expected to take ten years or more for sufficient funds to be gathered for the project, but Thomson Leys’ own generous material contribution expedited matters considerably. Agreeing to defray half the cost of the building and furnishings if the Auckland Council would provide a suitable site (which it did), and donating a considerable number of books (approximately 4,400) from his own extensive collection, The Leys Institute Library and meeting rooms were completed in under five years. Further donations of books were made by various patrons, while The Auckland Star ensured that the latest titles always graced the library's shelves through donations of the newspaper's own review copies.

Principal librarians

References

Libraries in Auckland
Heritage New Zealand Category 1 historic places in the Auckland Region
1900s architecture in New Zealand